Firebird USA LLC (formerly Firebird Skydiving GmbH and Firebird Sky Sports AG) is an American parachute manufacturer based in Eloy, Arizona. The company also has locations in Germany, Sri Lanka, and the Czech Republic, and was formerly based in Füssen and Bitburg, Germany. The company specializes in the design and manufacture of parachutes and at one time also constructed paragliders and parafoil kites.

Background
Firebird was founded as Performance Variable by Bernd Pohl in 1995. In 2017 skydivers Sara and Steve Curtis, and George Reuter purchased Firebird. After previously manufacturing its products in Germany and the Czech Republic, in 2018, the company moved its production facility to Eloy, Arizona, a city that has the world's biggest drop zone.

In the mid-2000s, as Firebird Sky Sports AG, the company produced a range of 11 different models of paragliders, including the beginner Firebird Sub-One and Z-One, the intermediate Grid and Hornet, the competition Debute and Tribute as well as the two-place Choice Zip Bi, that incorporated zippers to reduce its wing area. Once one of the world's leading manufacturers of paragliders, the company stopped producing them around 2013 to concentrate on parachutes for military and civil applications, along with reserve parachutes. Today, Firebird manufactures custom parachutes and related products such as tandem rigs for parachutes, reserve parachutes, harness-and-container systems, and magnetic riser covers.

Products

Canopies
 FB Tandem
 Rush Reserve
 Quick 400 Reserve

Containers
 Evo
 Evo Student
 Evo Tandem

Aircraft 

Summary of paragliders built by Firebird, introduced in the mid-2000s and since out of production:
 Firebird Choice Zip Bi
 Firebird Debute
 Firebird Grid
 Firebird Hornet
 Firebird Hornet Sport
 Firebird Sub-One
 Firebird Tribute
 Firebird Z-One

References

External links

 

Aircraft manufacturers of Germany
Parachuting in Germany
Paragliders
Manufacturing companies based in Arizona
Parachuting in the United States
Eloy, Arizona